Clivina sloanei is a species of ground beetle in the subfamily Scaritinae. It was described by Csiki in 1927.

References

sloanei
Beetles described in 1927